Anaerococcus murdochii is a bacterium from the family Peptoniphilaceae.
A. murdochii has been reported from skin and wound infections. 
Resistance or reduced susceptibility to several antibiotics, such as colistin sulphate, clindamycin and kanamycin A or penicillin has been reported.

References

Bacteria described in 2010
Peptoniphilaceae